The 2016 TAC Cup season was the 25th season of the TAC Cup competition. The season was won by the Sandringham Dragons while defeating the Murray Bushrangers in the grand final by 17 points, this claimed the Dragons third premiership title.

Ladder

Grand Final

References

NAB League
Nab League